Bherasalepur is a small village in the Cuttack district in eastern India. About 500 people live there.

References

External links

Villages in Cuttack district